The Italian loach (Sabanejewia larvata)  is a species of ray-finned fish in the family Cobitidae. It is found only in Italy. It is threatened by habitat loss.

References

Cobitidae
Endemic fauna of Italy
Fish described in 1859
Taxa named by Filippo De Filippi
Taxonomy articles created by Polbot